Jasper Frahm (born 7 March 1996) is a German road and track cyclist, who currently rides for German amateur team Berliner TSC. Representing Germany at international competitions, Frahm competed at the 2016 UEC European Track Championships in the team pursuit.

References

External links

1996 births
Living people
German male cyclists
German track cyclists
Place of birth missing (living people)
People from Stade (district)
Cyclists from Lower Saxony